Oztira is a genus of Australian tangled nest spiders first described by G. A. Milledge in 2011.

Species
 it contains four species:
Oztira affinis (Hickman, 1981) – Australia (Tasmania)
Oztira aquilonaria (Davies, 1986) – Australia (Queensland)
Oztira kroombit Milledge, 2011 – Australia (Queensland)
Oztira summa (Davies, 1986) – Australia (Queensland)

References

Amaurobiidae
Araneomorphae genera
Spiders of Australia